Anuj may refer to:
Anuj (name), Indian masculine given to the youngest brother in the family name (including a list of persons with the name)

 Anuj (singer), an Indian-born Australian pop-singer
 Anuj, Hamadan, a village in Iran
 Anuj-e Olya, a village in Iran
 Anuj-e Sofla, a village in Iran

See also
 Murder of Anuj Bidve